Bwletin Cymdeithas Emynau Cymru is a Welsh language magazine that includes critical studies of hymns and hymn-writers. Cymdeithas Emynau Cymru ("The Welsh Hymn Society") was founded in 1967 to promote the study and use of Welsh hymns and hymn tunes. The Bulletin's founding editor was Gomer M. Roberts. He was succeeded in 1978 by E. Wyn James.

The magazine has been digitised by the Welsh Journals Online project at the National Library of Wales.

External links
 Bwletin Cymdeithas Emynau Cymru at Welsh Journals Online
 Cymdeithas Emynau Cymru website

Music magazines published in the United Kingdom
History of Christianity in Wales
Magazines established in 1967
Welsh-language magazines
Magazines published in Wales